The 2007 Boise State Broncos football team represented Boise State University in the 2007 NCAA Division I FBS football season. The Broncos, led by second year head coach Chris Petersen, play their home games at Bronco Stadium, most famous for its blue artificial turf surface, often referred to as the "smurf-turf", and were members of the Western Athletic Conference.  The Broncos finished the season 10–3, 7–1 in WAC play and failed to win the WAC for the first time since 2001. They were invited to the Hawaii Bowl, where they were defeated by East Carolina, 41–38.

Previous season
The Broncos won the Western Athletic Conference (WAC) championship with an undefeated 12-0 regular-season record (8-0 in the WAC), their second unbeaten regular season in the past three years. This was also Boise State's fifth consecutive season with at least a share of the WAC title, and the fourth in that period in which they went unbeaten in conference play. They became only the second team from outside the Bowl Championship Series (BCS) to play in a BCS bowl game when they faced Oklahoma in the 2007 Fiesta Bowl, defeating the Sooners in a dramatic thriller.

The Broncos completed an unbeaten season with a 43-42 overtime win over the Sooners. The Broncos led most of the game, but lost the lead late in the fourth quarter when quarterback Jared Zabransky threw an interception that was returned for an Oklahoma touchdown. They tied the game on a 50-yard hook and ladder play that ended in a touchdown with 7 seconds left. In the overtime, Sooners star running back Adrian Peterson scored a touchdown on the first play of Oklahoma's possession. Zabransky led the Broncos on a touchdown drive, capped off by a trick play in which backup receiver Vinny Peretta connected with tight end Derek Schouman on a fourth-down pass. They then gambled for the win on a two-point conversion, and tried another trick play. The Broncos ran a play very similar to the Statue of Liberty play, with Zabransky looking toward three receivers before handing the ball off behind his back to star running back Ian Johnson, who ran into the end zone untouched for the win.

Thanks to Florida's 41-14 thrashing of previously unbeaten Ohio State in the BCS National Championship Game, the Broncos ended the season as the only undefeated team in NCAA Division I football, as no team in Division I-AA (officially known as the "Football Championship Subdivision") finished undefeated.  (Three teams in lower divisions finished unbeaten: Grand Valley State in Division II, Mount Union in Division III, and Sioux Falls in NAIA.)

National recognition immediately followed the Fiesta Bowl. Boise State was the talk of the sports world for weeks after the game. Many thought that the Fiesta Bowl was the best game ever through online polls. Boise finished the season sixth in the USA Today coaches poll and fifth in the AP poll, with a single first-place vote in the latter. Quarterback Jared Zabransky was later named to the cover of the NCAA Football 08 video game. Four Bronco players were drafted in the 2007 NFL Draft, the most ever in Boise State history. Eight more were later signed through free agency. The Broncos were also nominated and won the 2007 ESPY awards in the categories of Best Game (Fiesta Bowl) and Best Play (Statue of Liberty).

In February and March 2008, the Statue of Liberty play was voted by the fans on ESPN as the #2 greatest highlight of all time during a bracket style tournament to determine the greatest highlight ever. BSU's trick play lost in the final round to Mike Eurzione's goal against the USSR in the 1980 "Miracle on Ice".

Pre-season
Boise State was picked to finish second in the WAC by the media and by the coaches during the WAC media days. Hawaii was picked first in both polls. The Broncos were ranked #23 in the first Coaches poll and #24 in the AP poll. The Broncos enter the season with the nation's longest winning streak (13).

Pre-season awards
Ryan Clady- Outland Trophy Watch List, Rotary Lombardi Award Watch List, Playboy All American Team, NationalChamps.net 2nd Team All-American.

Ian Johnson- Heisman Trophy Candidate, Maxwell Award Watch List, Walter Camp Foundation Player of the Year Award Watch List, Doak Walker Award Candidate, Athlon, Street & Smith's and NationalChamps.net 3rd Team All-American.

Marty Tadman- Chuck Bednarick Award Watch List, Walter Camp Award Watch List, Sports Illustrated First Team All-American, NationalChamps.net Honorable Mention.

During the season
The 2007 season started Thursday, August 30, 2007. Boise State played 5 games on either ESPN or ESPN2. The Southern Miss game was played on a Thursday, the Nevada and New Mexico State games were played on Sundays and the Fresno State and Hawaii games were played on Fridays. The Washington game was also televised nationally via FOX Sports NET. Any game not televised nationally was broadcast locally in Boise on KTVB.

The Broncos also debuted new uniforms in the 2007 season, the most notable feature being the removal of last names on backs. The last names were put back on the uniforms for the final game of the regular season against Hawaii and remained for the Hawaii Bowl.

Schedule

Rankings

Game results

Weber State

56-7. Boise State opened its season hosting the Weber State Wildcats of Division I Football Championship Subdivision's (formerly known as I-AA) Big Sky Conference.  The Broncos scored on their first seven possessions to run the score to 49-0 at halftime. Ian Johnson rushed for 129 yards and 3 touchdowns, including a 54-yard run, and quarterback Taylor Tharp went 14-19 for 184 yards and 1 touchdown in his first collegiate start. Boise State gained a total of 571 yards to Weber State's 145. The victory pushed Boise States nations best winning streak to 14.

Washington
 24-10. Washington snapped the Broncos 14 game win streak. The Broncos were held to their lowest point total since losing 27-7 to Fresno State in 2005. Ian Johnson was held to 81 yards on 20 carries and Taylor Tharp went 29/47 for 281 and 3 interceptions and lost a fumble when he fell down while attempting a hand off in the loss. Washington started the game fast, jumping to a 14-0 lead. Boise State returned a kickoff for a touchdown after Washington's first score, but it was called back. Boise State never recovered.

Wyoming
24-14. Boise State ran their home winning streak to 8 and 53 of the last 55 with the 24-14 win over Wyoming. Ian Johnson had another subpar game rushing 24 times for 83 yards. Taylor Tharp went 15 of 30 for 182 and two touchdowns, one being a 52 yarder to Sophomore Jeremy Childs. The Bronco defense held the Cowboys to just 35 yards on 24 rushing attempts and collected three sacks of quarterback Karsten Sween. Kick returner Rashaun Scott was awarded the WAC special teams player of the week with two kickoffs returned for an average of 36.5 yards, one being for 52 yards in the fourth quarter. Boise State is still undefeated (11-0) against teams from the Mountain West Conference since its formation.

Southern Miss
38-16. Ian Johnson had his best game of the season thus far as he rushed for 111 yards and 3 touchdowns on 22 carries and added 80 yards on 3 receptions to earn the WAC offensive player of the week award. Taylor Tharp surpassed 300 yards passing for the first time as a starter by posting 307 yards on 19 of 27 for 2 touchdowns and 1 interception. The Broncos offense surpassed 500 yards with 506 total yards. The Broncos won their 39th consecutive regular season home game in front of a crowd of 30,159 that wore blue and orange in alternating sections in what has become known as the "Blue and Orange out."

New Mexico State
58-0. Boise State held the Aggies to 89 total yards of offense on -19 rushing yards and 108 passing yards. The Broncos gained over 600 yards of offense for the first time since November 20, 2004 by gaining 604 yards. Taylor Tharp went 19 of 26 for 251 and 4 Touchdowns. Jeremy Childs had the best game of his career with 6 catches for 102 yards and 3 touchdowns. The Broncos had 3 interceptions of Aggie quarterbacks (Scandrick, Wilson, Tadman). Boise State blocked 2 Aggie punts.

Nevada

69-67. After 1,266 combined total yards and an NCAA FBS record 136 points, Boise State was able to come away with the thrilling 69-67 win in four overtimes. Ian Johnson had 251 all purpose yards and three touchdowns, one of which was a career long 72-yard run. Taylor Tharp went 26-35 for 320, four touchdowns and one interception. Kicker Kyle Brotzman scored nineteen points on seven extra points and four field goals (40, 31, 27, 29), one coming with just three seconds left in regulation to send the game to overtime. Jeremy Childs had a career day making 12 catches for 140 yards and one touchdown. The game was sealed when Tim Brady sacked Nevada quarterback Colin Kaepernick on a two-point conversion attempt that would have tied and extended the game. Boise State now has won eight straight games over the Wolfpack and stay undefeated at home all time in WAC play. Ian Johnson was named the WAC offensive player of the week and Kyle Brotzman was named the WAC special teams player of the week. (The 136 points total record was matched later in the season when Navy beat North Texas 74-62)

Louisiana Tech
45-31. The Broncos and Bulldogs battled back and forth for 3 quarters, being tied four times at 7, 14, 17, and 24. Then the game was changed on an Orlando Scandrick forced fumble that led to an 83-yard touchdown pass from Taylor Tharp to Jeremy Childs. Tharp and Childs hooked up again from 27 yards out to seal the game late in the fourth. The total yards were almost identical (BSU 465, LATECH 463), but the Bulldogs were doomed by 4 turnovers. Tharp finished 21 of 35 for 328, 2 INTS and a career-high 5 touchdowns. Childs went over 100 yards for the third straight game making 7 receptions for 143 and the two fourth-quarter touchdowns.

Fresno State
34-21. Backup Running Backs Jeremy Avery and D.J. Harper filled the shoes of injured starter Ian Johnson by leading the Bronco rush attack that ran for 282 yards. Avery gained 124 yards on 18 carries and 3 touchdowns while Harper rushed for 153 yards on 19 carries and 1 touchdown. Taylor Tharp went 18 for 29 for 158 yards, 9 of his completions going to Jeremy Childs for 82 yards. Kyle Brotzman went 2 for 2 on field goals (43, 47, a career long) to win his second WAC special teams player of the week award this season and the Broncos blocked their sixth kick of the season by blocking a Bulldog field goal in the 2nd quarter. The Broncos beat the Bulldogs for the sixth time in the last seven years to win the Milk Can, the traveling trophy between the two schools that started in 2005. The game resulted in Boise State jumping back into the two major polls being #22 in the USA Today and tied with Wake Forrest at #21 in the AP as well as being #22 in the BCS rankings.

San Jose State

42-7. Taylor Tharp hit nine different receivers as he went 28 of 35 for 259, 3 touchdowns and 1 pick to lead the Broncos to their 42nd straight regular season home win. The Bronco defense held the Spartan offense to 150 total yards marking the 3rd time this season the Bronco defense has held opponents to 150 yards or less (Weber State, New Mexico State). Freshman receiver Austin Pettis had a breakout game making 7 receptions for 54 yards and 2 Touchdowns. The Bronco offense gained a total of 434 yards, but special teams was able to shorten the field by having returns of 51, 38, and 48 yards. The Bronco special teams, late in the game, was also able to block their 7th kick of the season by blocking a Spartan field goal. The Broncos moved up to #20 in the BCS rankings and #19 in both the USA Today and AP polls as a result of the win.

Utah State
52-0. Taylor Tharp went 26 of 29 for 283 and 2 touchdowns to lead the Broncos to their 8th straight win and their 7th straight against the Aggies. Ian Johnson broke 100 yards for the first time in 5 weeks by gaining 110 yards on 19 carries and a touchdown. Dallas Dobbs won WAC defensive player of the week with 4 tackles, one for a loss of 3 yards and 1 interception returned 29 yards to set up a 4th quarter Bronco touchdown. The Broncos blocked two more kicks, bringing their total to 9, 3 shy of the school record. One of the blocked kicks was a punt that was picked up and returned for a touchdown by Ia Falo. The other being a field goal blocked by Orlando Scandrick. The Broncos jumped to #15 in the USA Today coaches poll, #17 in the AP poll, and #18 in the BCS.

Idaho
58-14. The Broncos defeated their in-state rivals for the ninth straight year, retained the Governor's Trophy, and remained undefeated in WAC play to set up an unofficial WAC championship game with Hawaii. Taylor Tharp once again had a great game going 22 of 31 for 282 and 4 touchdowns. Freshman Austin Pettis had a career game making 8 receptions for 139 yards and 3 touchdowns. Backup Quarterback Bush Hamden added 2 touchdown passes, giving the Broncos 6 TD's through the air. With the win, the Broncos capped off their 7th straight season of going undefeated in WAC play at home in all 7 years they have been in the WAC. The Broncos remained at #17 in the AP poll, dropped 2 spots in the Coaches poll to #17, and dropped 1 spot to #19 in the BCS.

Hawaii
39-27. Boise State was unable to secure the WAC championship for the first time since 2001. Hawaii's Colt Brennan went 40 of 53 for 495, 5 TD's and 2 INT's to lead the Warriors past the Broncos for the first time since Boise State joined the WAC. The loss also ended the Broncos Conference winning streak at 17. Taylor Tharp went 22 of 36 for 231, 1 TD and 1 INT. Kyle Brotzman won the WAC special teams player of the week for the third time this season going 2-3 on FG's, 3 made extra points, and a punting average of 55.5 on his 4 punts, including a 71 yarder and 3 downed inside the 20-yard line. The Broncos blocked 2 Warrior extra points, bringing their total for the season to 11 blocked kicks.

Hawaii Bowl - East Carolina

Ben Hartman's 34-yard field goal as time expired clinched the upset victory for the Pirates over the #24 ranked Broncos. Other than an 89-yard Austin Smith kickoff return for a touchdown, the Broncos really couldn't get much going in the first half. ECU's Chris Johnson set an NCAA bowl record with 408 all purpose yards as he helped ECU build a 38-14 lead mid way through the 3rd quarter. The Broncos came back to make the game 38-31 late in the 4th and were driving to try to tie the game when a Titus Young fumble appeared to seal the Broncos fate. Two plays later as ECU was trying to run out the clock, Chris Johnson fumbled which led to a Marty Tadman 47-yard touchdown return to tie the game with 1:25 to play. ECU then drove the field to lead to Hartman's game-winning field goal. The Broncos are now 5-3 all time in Bowl games, but are 1-3 in their last 4 bowl games and have had 5 straight bowl games decided on the last play of the game or decided within the last few seconds.

WAC standings

Post Season Awards

First Team All WAC
Jeremy Childs- So. WR

Ryan Clady- Jr. OL

Ian Johnson- Jr. RB

Nick Schlekeway-Sr. DL

Marty Tadman- Sr. DB

Second Team All WAC
Tad Miller- Sr. OL

Taylor Tharp- Sr. QB

Kyle Wilson-So. DB

Kyle Brotzman- Fr. K

Roster

References

Boise State
Boise State Broncos football seasons
Boise State Broncos football